

281001–281100 

|-id=068
| 281068 Chipolin ||  || Chi Po-lin (1964–2017) was a Taiwanese documentary filmmaker, photographer and environmentalist, best known for his 2013 film Beyond Beauty: Taiwan from Above, which won Best Documentary at the 2013 Golden Horse Awards. || 
|}

281101–281200 

|-id=140
| 281140 Trier ||  || The Germany city of Trier, the birthplace of Karl Marx. It was founded by the Romans in 16 BCE, numerous historic monuments make it an outstanding testimony to the Roman Empire. The association Sternwarte Trier is heavily involved in astronomical education. || 
|}

281201–281300 

|-id=272
| 281272 Arnaudleroy ||  || Arnaud Leroy (born 1974), a French amateur astronomer at the Uranoscope Observatory and Pic du Midi Observatory in Paris and the Pyrenees, respectively || 
|}

281301–281400 

|-bgcolor=#f2f2f2
| colspan=4 align=center | 
|}

281401–281500 

|-id=445
| 281445 Scotthowe ||  || A. Scott Howe (born 1960), an American engineer at the Jet Propulsion Laboratory || 
|-id=459
| 281459 Kyrylenko ||  || The brothers Peter Kyrylenko (born 1987) and Dmytro Kyrylenko (born 1985), observers at the Andrushivka Observatory in Ukraine || 
|}

281501–281600 

|-id=507
| 281507 Johnellen ||  || John and Ellen McDonald, parents of Irish amateur astronomer David McDonald who discovered this minor planet at the Celbridge Observatory  || 
|-id=561
| 281561 Taitung ||  || Taitung County, located in the southeast of Taiwan || 
|-id=564
| 281564 Fuhsiehhai ||  || Hsieh-Hai Fu (1952—2020) was serve at the Department of Earth Sciences, National Taiwan Normal University, specializing in astronomy and science education, and training university students to teach astronomy in secondary education. He is the founder of the Star Watcher journal and the author of several popular science books. || 
|-id=569
| 281569 Taea ||  || Tainan Astronomical Education Area (TAEA) is an astronomy museum in Tainan, Taiwan. TAEA has been dedicated to fundamental astronomy education since it was established in 2007. || 
|}

281601–281700 

|-bgcolor=#f2f2f2
| colspan=4 align=center | 
|}

281701–281800 

|-id=764
| 281764 Schwetzingen ||  || Schwetzingen is a mid-sized town in the southwest of Germany. The first written reference "Suezzingen" dates back to 766 CE, while settlement can be traced back to the Stone Age. It is best known for its large baroque castle and surrounding park complex. Another famed specialty is the locally grown asparagus. || 
|-id=772
| 281772 Matttaylor ||  || Matt Taylor (born 1973), a British astrophysicist, involved in the landing of the Philae spacecraft on a comet during ESA's Rosetta mission || 
|}

281801–281900 

|-id=820
| 281820 Monnaves ||  || Ramon ("Mon") Naves Jr., son of one of the discoverers at Montcabre Observatory (213), Spain || 
|-id=880
| 281880 Wuweiren ||  || Wu Weiren (born 1953), an academician of Chinese Academy of Engineering, is the Chief Designer of China's Lunar Exploration Program, and has contributed significantly to China's lunar and deep-space exploration. The Chang'e-4 mission, which he designed, accomplished the first ever soft-landing on the far side of the moon. || 
|}

281901–282000 

|-bgcolor=#f2f2f2
| colspan=4 align=center | 
|}

References 

281001-282000